Brettle may refer to:

People
Notable people with the surname include:

 Audrey Brettle (1937–2003), author
 Bob Brettle (1832-1870), bare-knuckle boxer

Places
 Brettle (also spelt Britwell or Brettell), a hamlet that was formerly part of the manor of Kingswinford, now part of Brierley Hill, West Midlands, England

See also
 Brittle (disambiguation)